Inclusive may refer to:

 Inclusive disjunction, A or B or both
 Inclusive fitness, in evolutionary theory, how many kin are supported including non-descendants
 Inclusive tax, includes taxes owed as part of the base
 Inclusivism, a form of religious pluralism
 Inclusive first person, in linguistics

See also
 Inclusion (disambiguation)